Howard Samuel Bargreen (July 6, 1906 – December 18, 1987) was an American politician in the state of Washington. He served in the Washington House of Representatives and Washington State Senate.

References

1987 deaths
1906 births
Democratic Party Washington (state) state senators
Democratic Party members of the Washington House of Representatives
Politicians from Everett, Washington
20th-century American politicians